Metopodicha is a genus of moths of the family Noctuidae.

Species
 Metopodicha antherici (Christoph, 1884)
 Metopodicha ernesti Draudt, 1936
 Metopodicha longicornis Boursin, 1957

References
Natural History Museum Lepidoptera genus database
Metopodicha at funet

Cuculliinae